The ITU Süleyman Demirel Cultural Center is a multi-venue building located within Istanbul Technical University's Ayazağa campus in Maslak, Istanbul. The university's academic and cultural activities are held in this center.

References

External links 
 ITU SDCC website
 Gallery

Istanbul Technical University